SuperHyperCube is a 2016 puzzle video game by Kokoromi and Polytron for PlayStation VR and SteamVR.

Development 

An early version of the game was distributed as freeware in 2008. The developers were inspired by science fiction films and the Light and Space minimalist art movement. The team canceled Oculus Rift support after revelations that Oculus founder Palmer Luckey had financially backed Nimble America, an organization backing Donald Trump's 2016 United States presidential campaign. SuperHyperCube had been previously announced as timed exclusive for PlayStation VR. It was a PlayStation VR launch title, released on October 13, 2016. The game was later released for HTC Vive headsets via SteamVR on November 7, 2017.

References

Further reading

External links 

 

2016 video games
PlayStation 4 games
PlayStation VR games
Puzzle video games
Single-player video games